3639 may refer to:

 The year in the 37th century
 3639 (protein), a protein that in humans is encoded by the FUS gene
 3639 Weidenschilling, a main-belt asteroid